Jan Kozamernik (born 24 December 1995) is a Slovenian volleyball player who plays for Polish club Asseco Resovia and the Slovenian national team. With Slovenia, he was the runner-up of the European Volleyball Championship three times, in 2015, 2019 and 2021.

Sporting achievements

Club
 Continental
 2020–21 CEV Challenge Cup – with Allianz Powervolley Milano

 Domestic
 2014–15 Slovenian Cup, with ACH Volley
 2014–15 Slovenian Championship, with ACH Volley
 2015–16 Slovenian Championship, with ACH Volley
 2016–17 Slovenian Championship, with ACH Volley

Individual awards
 2019: CEV European Championship – Best middle blocker

References

External links

 
 Player profile at LegaVolley.it  
 Player profile at PlusLiga.pl  
 Player profile at Volleybox.net 

1995 births
Living people
Sportspeople from Ljubljana
Slovenian men's volleyball players
Slovenian expatriate sportspeople in Italy
Expatriate volleyball players in Italy
Trentino Volley players
Slovenian expatriate sportspeople in Poland
Expatriate volleyball players in Poland
Resovia (volleyball) players
Middle blockers